Valentin Vornicu is a mathematician, software engineer and a professional poker player, with 12 World Series of Poker circuit rings. Valentin is from Romania and now resides in San Diego, California. Vornicu is the founder of MathLinks, an educational resource company. Before founding MathLinks, he worked as a full-stack engineer for Art of Problem Solving.

Mathematics and education
Valentin Vornicu was a part of the Romanian team for the International Mathematics Olympiad (IMO) in 2001 and 2002. In 2002 he earned a bronze medal at the IMO. He graduated at the University of Bucharest in 2006, and got his Master's Degree in Algebra and Number Theory at the same University in 2008. Vornicu also, in 2007, discovered a generalized form of Schur's inequality, usually cited on online forums as "Vornicu-Schur inequality", which he published in a problem-solving book titled Olimpiada de Matematica.

MathLinks.ro and Art of Problem Solving

In 2002, Vornicu founded an educational resource company known as MathLinks.ro. In 2004, he merged the company with Art of Problem Solving, a company in which he was previously the webmaster. In 2010, he left the company, but is still involved by teaching for the online school.

International Mathematical Olympiad

Vornicu was a 2-time IMO participant, having won a Honorable Mention in 2001, and a Bronze Medal in 2002, but his involvement with the IMO did not stop here. He was Observer A with the Romanian delegation at the IMO 2003 in Japan, Observer B at the IMO 2004 in Greece, a Coordinator at the IMO 2005 in Mexico as well as the IMO 2006 in Slovenia, Observer B at the IMO 2007 in Vietnam and again a Coordinator for the IMO 2008 in Spain. He co-wrote one of the problems used in the IMO 2004 test. Currently, he is tutoring rising students for mathematical olympiads part-time.

MathLinks Summer Program

Vornicu founded the MathLinks Summer Program in 2011. This is a newly created three-week residential summer math program for students ages 12 to 18, based in San Diego, California.

See also
International Mathematics Olympiad
http://pokerdb.thehendonmob.com/player.php?a=r&n=197837

References

Living people
1983 births
International Mathematical Olympiad participants